The Madrid Distinction was one of the highest military awards of the Second Spanish Republic. It was a decoration related to the Laureate Plate of Madrid. which was established by the Second Spanish Republic in order to reward courage. In the same manner as the Laureate Plate it was named after Madrid, the capital of Spain, owing to the city symbolizing valour and the defence of the Spanish Republic during the long Siege of Madrid throughout the Spanish Civil War.

History
The Distintivo de Madrid was first awarded in January 1938 to certain warships of the loyalist fleet as well as to their crew members for their role in the Battle of Cape Palos. Meanwhile the admiral of the Spanish Republican Navy, Luis González de Ubieta, was awarded the Laureate Plate of Madrid for the same action.

The war ended in April the following year with the defeat of the Spanish Republic by the rebel faction and this meant the end of the short existence of this military award. Unlike the Laureate Plate of Madrid, the Madrid Distinction displayed the former coat of arms of Madrid and not the red star, a symbol often associated with communist ideology.

Awardees

Vessels
The following Spanish Republican Navy ships would fly the Distintivo de Madrid special pennant.
Cruiser Libertad 
Cruiser Méndez Núñez
Destroyer Lepanto
Destroyer Almirante Antequera 
Destroyer Sánchez Barcáiztegui

Persons
All the crew members of the ships that took part in the  Cape Palos naval battle were awarded the Distintivo de Madrid. They were issued a special cloth badge to wear on their uniforms.

See also
List of military decorations - Spain
Laureate Plate of Madrid
Order of the Spanish Republic
Flag of the Second Spanish Republic

References

External links 
Placa Laureada de Madrid
Segunda República (1931-1939)
República - EPR, Condecoraciones

1938 establishments in Spain
1939 disestablishments in Spain
Madrid
Spanish Republican Navy
Military awards and decorations of the Spanish Civil War
History of Madrid
Awards established in 1938
Awards disestablished in 1939
Awards and decorations of the Second Spanish Republic